Corazones (Eng.: Hearts) is a song written by Ana Torroja, Lanfranco Ferrario, Massimo Grillo and Miguel Bosé. The song is a live recording taken from GiraDos En Concierto, an album released by Bosé and Torroja in 2000. Is the only new song included on the setlist of a very successful worldwide tour by both performers.

The track was later included on Torroja's compilation album Essential in 2004 and in 2007 on Bosé's Papito Special Edition.

Chart performance

2000 songs
Male–female vocal duets
Spanish songs
Songs written by Miguel Bosé